Palm Bay Imports, Inc. v. Veuve Clicquot Ponsardin Maison Fondee en 1772, 396 F.3d 1369 (Fed. Cir. 2005), was a case decided by the United States Court of Appeals for the Federal Circuit clarifying the doctrine of foreign equivalents.  The court explained that there is a threshold limitation to applying the doctrine of foreign equivalents.  The doctrine "should be applied only when it is likely that the ordinary American purchaser would 'stop and translate [the word] into its English equivalent.'"

References

External links
 

2005 in United States case law
United States Court of Appeals for the Federal Circuit cases
United States trademark case law